WUPC-LP (102.3 FM) is a low-power FM radio station broadcasting a Spanish religious format. Licensed to Arrowhead Village, New Jersey, United States, the station is currently owned by Radio Alerta.

History
The Federal Communications Commission issued a construction permit for the station on June 26, 2002. The station was assigned the WUPC-LP call sign on August 14, 2002, and received its license to cover on June 4, 2004.

References

External links

 

UPC-LP
UPC-LP
Radio stations established in 2004